The Norwegian Institute of Food, Fisheries and Aquaculture Research (also known as Nofima), is a food science research institute in Norway. The head office is located in Tromsø, with research activities in Bergen, Stavanger, Sunndalsøra, Tromsø and Ås.

Nofima was established on 1 January 2008, following a political decision to merge four research institutions (Matforsk, Fiskeriforskning, Norconserv and Akvaforsk). Nofima has approximately 390 employees.

The current CEO of Nofima is Dr Øyvind Fylling-Jensen.

References

External links
 Official website

Research institutes in Norway
Independent research institutes
Food science institutes